Cal State LA Studios is the production area of the Department of Television, Film, and Media Studies at California State University, Los Angeles, the only  CSU campus in the Los Angeles basin.
Bachelor of Arts degrees are offered in Telecommunications and Film, Broadcast Journalism and Animation. Master of Arts degree programs include Screenwriting and Critical Studies as well as a three option Master of Fine Arts (MFA) program in Dramatic Writing, Production/Direction, and Performance in Television, Film, & Theatre Arts. Production facilities and equipment include: 3-camera digital television studios, dedicated news studio, nonlinear postproduction workstations, postproduction labs and individual editing suites, 16 mm motion picture camera kits, DV and HDV camera kits, field lighting kits, and misc. grip equipment. In 2014 the department open a new building, the Television, Film and Media Studies Center with a new sound stage and audio post-production facilities.

References

External links
 Official site
 Master of Fine Arts in Television, Film, & Theatre Arts at Cal State LA

Education in Los Angeles
Film schools in California
California State University, Los Angeles